Air Marshal Archibald Oliver Garfield Wilson  (28 May 1921 – 4 July 2014) was a Rhodesian fighter pilot who served in the Royal Air Force during World War II. He went on to become a senior commander and then Air Marshal in the Rhodesian Air Force in the 1960s and early 1970s. After retirement, he served two terms in the Rhodesian House of Assembly, in the Zimbabwe-Rhodesian Parliament in 1979, and then in the Zimbabwe Parliament in 1981–1982. He held several cabinet portfolios prior to the Internal Settlement. He resigned in 1982 to emigrate, with his wife Lorna, to Australia's Gold Coast in 1982. He became a citizen of Australia in 1988.

Air force career
Wilson joined the Southern Rhodesian Air Force in 1939. He served in World War II as a pilot and then as Officer Commanding No. 238 Squadron from 1943. After the War he held command positions in Southern Rhodesian Air Force (later the Royal Rhodesian Air Force and the Rhodesian Air Force). From 10 June 1957 to 22 June 1959, he was commanding officer of RRAF Thornhill. Wilson was involved in directing the Rhodesian counter-insurgency operations in Nyasaland, Zambia and Rhodesia.

On 8 February 1969 Wilson was appointed Chief of the Air Staff of the Royal Rhodesian Air Force, receiving promotion to the rank of Air vice-marshal. With Rhodesia becoming a republic from 2 March 1970, Wilson oversaw various changes to the force and his role, including new ranks, ensign, roundel, and the renaming of the force from 8 August 1970 as the "Rhodesian Air Force" (RhAF). At the same time his office of Chief of the Air Staff was changed to Commander of the Air Force, and Wilson was promoted to the rank of Air marshal. In 1970–71 Wilson was involved in the development of the secret Alcora Exercise military alliance between Rhodesia, South Africa and Portugal. On the occasion of the 25th anniversary of the 1947 formation of the Southern Rhodesia Air Force in November 1972, Wilson announced: "Our Air Force will continue to fulfil its role with quiet efficiency and is ready and able to do its duty – come what may."

After 32 years, Wilson retired from Air Force service on 15 April 1973, being the last remaining member of the original Southern Rhodesia Air Force and the last Chief of the Air Staff. On his retirement he expressed a hopeful tone: "Terrorism in Rhodesia will probably get worse before it gets better but the security forces will win. Terrorism cannot win. It cannot achieve its aim."

Politics
As a member of Ian Smith's Rhodesian Front, Wilson was elected to the House of Assembly as the member for Arundel at the Rhodesian general election in 1974. He retained his seat during the 1977 general election.

Later life
After resigning from the Senate in July 1982, Wilson decided to emigrate with his wife Lorna to Australia in August 1982. Wilson and his family settled in the Gold Coast region of Queensland, receiving Australian citizenship on 25 October 1988. With his wife Lorna predeceasing him (27 July 1923 – 22 August 2008) when she died in Brisbane at age 85, Wilson spent his last few years in the RSL Care retirement community in Pinjarra Hills until his death at the age of 93 on 4 July 2014. He is buried with his wife in Tamborine Mountain Cemetery.

Honours

References

|-

|-

|-

1921 births
2014 deaths
People from Bulawayo
Rhodesian Air Force air marshals
Southern Rhodesian military personnel of World War II
Southern Rhodesian World War II pilots
Rhodesian military personnel of the Bush War
Zimbabwean people of British descent
White Rhodesian people
Officers of the Order of the British Empire
Recipients of the Distinguished Flying Cross (United States)
Rhodesian Front politicians
Naturalised citizens of Australia
Zimbabwean emigrants to Australia
Members of the Parliament of Rhodesia
Members of the Senate of Zimbabwe